Óscar Garcia Valles (born 11 February 1973) is a Spanish former footballer who currently manages Spanish side CD Victoria de Tazacorte.

Valles played for Dundee United F.C. during the 1997–98 season.

See also
 1997–98 Dundee United F.C. season
 Football in Thailand
 List of football clubs in Thailand

References

1973 births
Living people
Spanish footballers
Dundee United F.C. players
Scottish Football League players
Association football midfielders